In mathematics, a nearly Kähler manifold is an almost Hermitian manifold , with almost complex structure ,
such that the (2,1)-tensor  is skew-symmetric. So,

In particular, a Kähler manifold is nearly Kähler. The converse is not true. 
For example, the nearly Kähler six-sphere  is an example of a nearly Kähler manifold that is not Kähler.
Usually, non Kählerian nearly Kähler manifolds are called "strict nearly Kähler manifolds".

Nearly Kähler manifolds, also known as almost Tachibana manifolds, were studied by Shun-ichi Tachibana in 1959 and then by Alfred Gray from 1970 on.
For example, it was proved that any 6-dimensional strict nearly Kähler manifold is an Einstein manifold and has vanishing first Chern class
(in particular, this implies spin). 
In the 1980s, strict nearly Kähler manifolds obtained a lot of consideration because of their relation to Killing
spinors: Thomas Friedrich and Ralf Grunewald showed that a 6-dimensional Riemannian manifold admits
a Riemannian Killing spinor if and only if it is nearly Kähler. This was later given a more fundamental  explanation  by Christian Bär, who pointed out  that
these  are exactly the 6-manifolds for which the corresponding 7-dimensional Riemannian cone has holonomy G2.

Each of these admits such a unique nearly Kähler metric that is also homogeneous, and these examples are in fact  the only compact  homogeneous strictly nearly Kähler 6-manifolds.
However, Foscolo and Haskins recently showed that  and   also admit strict nearly Kähler metrics that are not homogeneous.

Bär's observation about the  holonomy of Riemannian cones might seem to indicate that the nearly-Kähler condition is 
most natural and interesting in dimension 6.  This actually borne out by a theorem of  Nagy, who proved that any strict,  complete nearly Kähler manifold is locally a Riemannian product of homogeneous nearly Kähler spaces, twistor spaces over quaternion-Kähler manifolds, and 6-dimensional nearly Kähler manifolds.

Nearly Kähler manifolds are also an interesting class of manifolds admitting a metric connection with
parallel totally antisymmetric torsion.

Nearly Kähler manifolds should not be confused with  almost Kähler manifolds.
An almost Kähler manifold  is an almost Hermitian manifold with a closed Kähler form:
. The Kähler form or fundamental 2-form  is defined by

The  nearly Kähler condition and the almost Kähler condition are essentially exclusive: an almost Hermitian manifold is both nearly Kähler and almost Kahler if and only if it is Kähler.

References

Topology
Differential geometry
Manifolds